The 1926 New York state election was held on November 2, 1926, to elect the governor, the lieutenant governor, the state comptroller, the attorney general, a U.S. Senator, the chief judge and an associate judge  of the New York Court of Appeals, as well as all members of the New York State Assembly and the New York State Senate. A referendum to repeal Prohibition was also proposed and accepted by a very large majority.

History
The Prohibition state convention met on June 24 at 150 Fifth Avenue in New York City and nominated Charles E. Manierre for governor. The party had lost its automatic ballot access in 1922, had not run in 1924, and now needed to gather signatures and file a petition to go on the ballot.

The Republican state convention met on September 28 at the Madison Square Garden in New York City, and nominated Ogden L. Mills for governor and re-nominated the incumbent U.S. Senator James W. Wadsworth, Jr.

The Democratic state convention met on September 28 at Syracuse, New York, and re-nominated Governor Al Smith.

Result
Almost the whole Democratic ticket was elected, only the Republican incumbent Attorney General Ottinger managed to stay in office.

The incumbents Smith and Ottinger were re-elected. The incumbents Lowman, Murphy and Wadsworth were defeated. 

The Democratic, Republican and Socialist parties maintained automatic ballot access (necessary 25,000 votes for governor), the Prohibition and Socialist Labor Party did not re-attain it, and the Workers Party did not attain it.

Notes

Sources
Result (Prohibition only): Vote for Prohibition candidates at Prohibitionists.org
Results NYT OFFICIAL PLURALITY FOR SMITH 247,478 (Subscription required)
Vote totals-New York Red Book 1927

See also
New York gubernatorial elections
New York state elections

1926
 
November 1926 events